Christopher Steven Chantler (born 16 December 1990) is an English footballer who plays as a defender or midfielder for Colne FC. He previously played for Spennymoor Town. He has previously played for Manchester City, Carlisle United, Kilmarnock and Macclesfield Town.

Club career

Manchester City
Chantler first signed for Manchester City at the age of seventeen after being scouted by former City player Neil Young. Having graduated from the club's academy, Chantler had been playing for the Elite Development Squad for two seasons when he made his debut for the first team, coming on as a substitute in the final minutes of the Europa League game against Juventus on his 20th birthday, 16 December 2010.

At the time at Manchester City, Chantler wore number 53 shirt for the club. Chantler described his time at Manchester City as "crazy" and "ridiculous", as he didn't get first team opportunities for the club, which by his standard very harsh.

Carlisle United
On 23 November 2011, Chantler joined League One outfit Carlisle United on loan until 2 January 2012. He went on to impress manager Greg Abbott and secured a permanent switch to Carlisle United on 6 January 2012, signing an 18-month contract. However, Chantler ended his season with 12 appearances after a hamstring problem that ruled him out for the rest of the season. Despite being on the sideline, Chantler stated the club's supporters were supportive for him to settle.

Following his return in the pre-season, Chantler continued to be in the first team and spoke out in the interview of his frustration on his thigh injury. However, in early-February, Chantler ended his season with 25 appearances after ankle injury put him out for the remainder of the season. Despite his injury, Chantler signed a new contract with the club for another season. Shortly signing a new contract, Chantler stated that he now intending to focus on rehabilitating his ankle. Chantler expressed his frustration on his injury.

At the start of the season, Chantler had his second operation on his ankle injury, resulting him missing out start of the season. Four months later, Chantler returned to training and expressed positively on getting involved. After five months out, Chantler made his return for the club, in a match against Gillingham on 2 November 2013, making a start, in a 1–0 loss. He says he happy to be back making a return to the first team. Since making a return in the first team, Chantler had made his return in the first team and his first team increased following injuries of players.

At the end of the 2013–14 season, it announced that Chantler was among 11 players to be released by the club.

Kilmarnock
On 9 August 2014, Chantler signed for Scottish Premiership side Kilmarnock on a one-year contract.

He made his debut that day, as Kilmarnock drew 1–1 away to Dundee. Chantler then provided assist for Josh Magennis, in a 2–1 win over Ross County on 16 August 2014, followed up with another assist for Robbie Muirhead, in another win against Motherwell on 23 August 2014. Chantler continued to be in the first team, playing as a left-back until he suffered a knee injury that caused him to miss the remainder of the season.

After making 26 appearances for the club, Chantler was released at the end of the season.

Macclesfield Town

On 6 January 2016, it was announced that he had signed for Macclesfield Town.

FC United of Manchester

On 23 January 2016, it was announced that he had signed for National League North side FC United of Manchester. He made a goalscoring debut the same day at Broadhurst Park in a 6–1 win against Lowestoft Town. He was also made man of the match. He contributed in the second half of the season, to a mid-table finish respectively.

Career statistics

References

External links

1990 births
Living people
People from Cheadle Hulme
English footballers
Association football midfielders
Association football utility players
Manchester City F.C. players
Carlisle United F.C. players
Kilmarnock F.C. players
Macclesfield Town F.C. players
F.C. United of Manchester players
Spennymoor Town F.C. players
Ossett United F.C. players
Colne F.C. players
English Football League players
Scottish Professional Football League players
National League (English football) players